Mbula-Bwazza is one of the Bantu languages spoken in Nigeria. It is a dialect cluster; Blench (2011) divides it into several languages, as follows:
 Bwazza
 Mbula: Mbula, Tambo, Kula, Gwamba

References

Jarawan languages
Languages of Nigeria